Grouvellinus is a genus of beetle in the family Elmidae. , over forty species are recognized, including:

 Grouvellinus aeneus  — Indonesia
 Grouvellinus amabilis  — Vietnam
 Grouvellinus andrekuipersi  — Malaysia 
 Grouvellinus babai 
 G. b. babai  — Taiwan
 G. b. satoi  — Japan
 Grouvellinus bishopi  — Malaysia
 Grouvellinus brevior  — Nepal
 Grouvellinus carinatus  — Nepal
 Grouvellinus carus  — China
 Grouvellinus caucasicus  — Armenia, Georgia, Greece, Iran, Iraq, Israel, Lebanon, Russia, Syria, Turkey
 Grouvellinus chinensis  — China
 Grouvellinus duplaris  — India
 Grouvellinus frater  — Indonesia
 Grouvellinus hadroscelis  — Nepal
 Grouvellinus hercules  — China, Nepal
 Grouvellinus hygropetricus  — Taiwan
 Grouvellinus impressus  — Indonesia
 Grouvellinus leonardodicaprioi  — Malaysia
 Grouvellinus marginatus  — Japan
 Grouvellinus modiglianii  — Indonesia
 Grouvellinus montanus  — Taiwan
 Grouvellinus nepalensis  — China, Nepal
 Grouvellinus nitidus  — Japan
 Grouvellinus orbiculatus  — China
 Grouvellinus pelacoti  — Vietnam
 Grouvellinus pilosus  — Taiwan
 Grouvellinus punctatostriatus  — Myanmar
 Grouvellinus quest  — Malaysia
 Grouvellinus rioloides  — Afghanistan, China, Kazakhstan, Kyrgyzstan, Tajikistan, Turkmenistan, Uzbekistan
 Grouvellinus sagittatus  — China
 Grouvellinus sculptus  — Myanmar
 Grouvellinus setosus  — Vietnam
 Grouvellinus silius  — Indonesia
 Grouvellinus sinensis  — China
 Grouvellinus subopacus  — Japan
 Grouvellinus sumatrensis  — Indonesia
 Grouvellinus thienemanni  — Indonesia
 Grouvellinus tibetanus  — China, Nepal
 Grouvellinus tonkinus  — Vietnam
 Grouvellinus unicostatus  — India

References

Elmidae
Byrrhoidea genera